Georgios Kousas (Greek: Γεώργιος Κούσας; born 12 August 1982) is a Greek footballer who plays as a centre back.

Career
Kousas began his playing career by signing with Aris in July 2000.

References

 Guardian Football 
 insports.gr
 

1982 births
Living people
Greek footballers
Greece under-21 international footballers
Greek expatriate footballers
Aris Thessaloniki F.C. players
Apollon Pontou FC players
PAS Giannina F.C. players
Panetolikos F.C. players
Association football central defenders
Footballers from Thessaloniki